The following persons have served as Provost of King's College, Cambridge since its foundation in 1441.

References

http://www.british-history.ac.uk/report.aspx?compid=66649#s17

 
King's